The Last Detective is a book written by Peter Lovesey and published by Soho Crime (now owned by Penguin Random House) in 1991, which later went on to win the Anthony Award for Best Novel in 1992.

References 

Anthony Award-winning works
British mystery novels
1991 British novels
Charles Scribner's Sons books